My Life as Liz is a mockumentary-style American comedy television series that centers on the life of Liz Lee, a misfit high-school senior living in a small town in Texas. The series debuted on MTV on January 18, 2010.

The first-season finale aired on March 8, 2010. Filming for the second season began early 2010 in New York City, mostly at Pratt Institute, the college which series star Liz Lee attends. Season two premiered February 8, 2011, and consisted of 12 episodes. The series was not renewed for a third season, and the series finale aired on May 3, 2011.

Genre 

My Life as Liz uses the camera-work and editing typical of reality television. The show hints at Liz living in a small country-like town where her individuality is constantly threatened. The Texas city Liz lives in is a rapidly growing city of over 35,000 residents. The show targets isolated scenes repeatedly to hide this truth and leaves something to be desired in the lack of diversity. The Los Angeles Times asserts that the show "is quasi-reality—real people, in their real environment, leading lives that are being in some way dramatized" and that the show "flirts with documentary but intersperses scenes of high-school hallway conversations". An MTV executive has stated, "We don't look at it as just a reality show. We weren't going to call it a sitcom, because it's not." Executive Producer Marshall Eisen stated, "The rule was, when Liz is around other people, we played that as straight as we could. When she's alone, that's when we were able to stylize things more." Liz herself has confirmed that there are multiple scenes that are "planned", citing the scene in "Liz's Got Talent (Part 1)", where Liz dresses as a superhero, and in "Summer of Suck", where Taylor Terry is shown in front of a black screen, but the events and relationships are true. The series frequently uses music from Faded Paper Figures, both for its end credits and during various episodes.

Series overview
Season one focused on the life of Liz Lee. She lives in Burleson, Texas, a conservative, religious suburb in the Dallas-Fort Worth metro area; she is extremely proud to be a geek and is happy to have her friends. The show also focuses on Liz's main antagonist, Cori Cooper and her minions Taylor Terry and Tori Langley, and all of Liz's friends, such as Bryson Gilreath (who is also her love interest), Colin "Sully" Sullivan, Miles Reed, and Troy Yingst. Season one shows Liz's journey through her senior year in high school, and her struggles with her enemy Cori Cooper. Season two is set in New York, with Liz adjusting to old and new friends.

Cast
Elizabeth "Liz" Lee:
The show's main character, is a girl from Burleson, Texas. She is a self-proclaimed individualist and geek. She feels that in her town people are either stuck-up or narrow-minded. She admits she used to be a typical "preppy girl", until Cori Cooper betrayed her in high school. She enjoys reading comic books and is obsessed with Star Wars. Season one covers how she deals with high-school drama, sometimes with Cori involved. In "My Secret Valentine", she begins to develop a crush on her friend, Bryson, even though he has a girlfriend at the time. Their friendship gradually gets stronger as he gives Liz support during her high school talent show, even playing guitar alongside Liz to make her less nervous when performing. Despite their friendship, Bryson rejects her offer to go to the prom and makes Liz want to forget. In the season one finale, however, Bryson finally confesses his feelings to Liz. After high school, she moves to New York to attend Pratt Institute. However, she meets very few people and has troubling juggling her long-distance relationship with Bryson. It is in New York where she meets Louis, a possible boyfriend after Bryson is dishonest with her in "The Morning After".

Colin "Sully" Sullivan:
Liz's sidekick and best friend. He takes pride in his comic book collection and is always there for Liz. He is a huge supporter for her, especially when she auditions for her school talent show by making T-shirts in support for Liz. It's revealed in "The ABC's of Friendship" that he secretly likes Liz but will not take the chance of asking her out; he fears it might jeopardize their great friendship. During high school prom, Liz invites Sully to come with him after being rejected by her love interest, Bryson. In "A Prom to Remember (Part 2)", Sully shows that he wants to get Liz and Bryson together by distracting Bryson's date in order for them to have alone time. In season two, Sully remains loyal to Liz and her relationship with Bryson. He gets extremely protective of Liz when he meets Louis for the first time in "The New Morning". During his visit in New York, he meets a girl named Marlene, who shares his love of comics and inevitably develops a crush on her. In the season two finale, Sully returns to New York finally admits his love for Liz in order for him to move on towards Marlene. However, Sully fails when Marlene "pulls the friend card."

Bryson Gilreath:
Liz's crush during season one; however, he has a girlfriend. They almost kiss at the end of season one, but their friends awkwardly cheer before the kiss. In season two, Bryson surprises Liz in New York and they finally kiss, however, Liz finds out that Bryson supposedly has a girlfriend back home in Austin. He is supposed to love her but it seems like he does since he leaves school for the weekend and spends it with her. Afterward, Bryson desperately tries to contact her, but Liz continues to ignore him. Once he finds out that she is dating Louis, he gets jealous, and due to Sully exposing his feelings about Liz, he admits to Liz that he does in fact love her in the season two finale.

Taylor Terri:
A past sidekick for Cori Cooper, Liz's antagonist. At first, Liz doesn't trust her because of Taylor befriending Liz in the summer but ignoring her while in school. However, throughout Liz's senior year at Burleson High, she and Taylor slowly become good friends; for example, when she stands up for Liz against Cori Cooper at her ABC party. While helping Liz to be with Bryson, Taylor also befriends Sully and the rest of the gang, and is seen during season two frequently hanging out with the group while Liz is in New York. In season two, it was revealed that Taylor has decided to go to college in New York as well.

Cori Cooper (season 1, guest season 2):
Known as the "Queen of Mean", Cori is very self-absorbed and hates "anyone who has an original thought". She is the most popular girl in school, because she's the prettiest. She is also a member of the "blonde squad", which consists of her, Taylor, and Tori. She will do whatever it takes to get what she wants, and no one can stand in her way. She always looks for ways to get back at Liz, her nemesis. Cori does suffer a few personal defeats in the series, such as when she verbally attacks Liz at a party being given by Taylor, who stood up for her against Cori's insults. Cori then demands that she choose between her and Liz. Taylor, finally having had enough of Cori's hateful behavior, chooses Liz. Later in the season during the "A Prom to Remember (Part 2)" episode, Liz had a mini-meltdown right before the school announced the prom queen, which was awarded to someone else. Cori then had a meltdown and went to the bathroom with her other friend, crying about how she feels and how she thinks everyone in the school hates her, and now realizes that her shallow, stuck-up, and vindictive ways have finally led to her downfall. It was revealed in season two that she had a baby.

Louis M Johnson (season 2):
An aspiring musician in a two-man band, Louis meets Liz in the season two premiere while she was dumpster diving for art project materials. At first, she considered him a sign of moving on from Bryson, until Bryson visits her in New York. After learning of Bryson's girlfriend in Texas, Louis is the one who cheers her up. He continues to flirt with Liz while she searches for an apartment and even lets her move in with him temporarily. When Louis finally gets the chance to go out with her, he ends up meeting Sully and the gang, who are skeptical of him at first and make it their priority to make sure he won't hurt Liz. Liz actually offers to sing with Louis at a 1980s gig, where they share their first kiss after their performance. In the season two finale, Liz and Louis decide to put their relationship on hold while he goes on tour with his band Augustine.

Episodes

Season 1 (2010)

Season 2 (2011)

Critical response 

Emily VanDerWerff of The A.V. Club gave the first episode of season one a C rating. She compared the show to the style of the Coen Brothers films and of mockumentary of Christopher Guest, but criticized it for having learned all the wrong lessons. She credited the show with having some goofy charm but was disappointed by the same old stereotypes. She questioned if the show is a sitcom blended with a reality show or the other way around. She criticized the heavily-scripted nature of the show, but noted the show could be fixed if it was more honest and decisive about what it really wants to be.

Mike Hale of The New York Times gave a somewhat similar opinion, saying, "it registers more as a sitcom than a reality show — it's so stylized and carefully planned and post-produced, it's the next best thing to scripted, if it isn’t in fact a wholly scripted put-on," but remarks, "and that's the point." He says of the premise that "it's as if the geeky misfit viewer who hates all those blonde women on The Hills were suddenly part of the show." Although he says the main protagonist "doesn’t make her life or her opinions seem interesting enough to draw you in," he finds some of the other characters make more of an impression.

Notes

References

External links
 
 Podcast Interview

2010 American television series debuts
2011 American television series endings
2010s American high school television series
2010s American mockumentary television series
2010s American reality television series
English-language television shows
MTV original programming
Television series about teenagers
Television shows filmed in Texas
Television shows set in New York City
Television shows set in Texas